Driving with Greenland Dogs, is a Danish silent film made in 1897 by the photographer Peter Elfelt. It was the first movie sequence filmed in Denmark. The film, less than one minute in length (10 meters of 35mm film), shows a Danish colony manager named Johan Carl Joensen driving a sledge pulled by Greenlandic sled dogs through Fælledparken in Copenhagen, Denmark. In the short sequence, the dog sled is driven toward the camera across a flat snow-covered landscape, it disappears out of the picture, and then reappears from the other side with the driver chasing behind. Elfelt shot the film using a camera he had constructed from detailed plans that Elfelt obtained from the French inventor, Jules Carpentier.

References

External links 

 
 
 Watch on Stumfilm.dk
 Watch Kørsel med Grønlandske Hunde on YouTube

1890s short documentary films
1897 films
Danish black-and-white films
Danish short documentary films
Danish silent short films
Danish-language films
Mushing films